Puca Mauras (possibly from Quechua puka red) is a volcano in the Andes of Peru, about  high. It is situated at the "Valley of the Volcanoes"  in the Arequipa Region, Castilla Province, on the border of the districts of Andagua and Chilcaymarca. Puca Mauras lies in the western extensions of the Chila mountain range, northeast of the Ticsho and Yanamauras volcanoes.

References

Volcanoes of Peru
Mountains of Arequipa Region
Mountains of Peru
Landforms of Arequipa Region